A jodekoek (in Dutch, literally "Jew biscuit", plural jodekoeken) is a big, flat, round shortbread biscuit with a diameter of about 10 centimeters (4").

History 

Claimed to have been first baked in the 17th century, these biscuits were advertised by bakeries as early as 1872. Jodenkoeken were made famous by a baker called Davelaar, in Alkmaar, Netherlands. The Stam bakery in Alkmaar started selling jodenkoeken in 1883, and Gijs Verhoeven took over this bakery in 1924.  By advertising in local newspapers and by offering the biscuits through other shops, his jodenkoeken became a popular product. The company continues to bake them to this day.  Similar products with the same name are produced by Lotus Bakeries and O'Lacy.

Etymology 

Some producers still use the old spelling, jodekoek, while others have changed the name of the product to jodenkoek, after the new orthography of the Netherlands from 1996.

There are four different stories about the name of the biscuits:
 Lotus Bakeries claims that the recipe originates from a Jewish baker in Amsterdam who sold the biscuits around 1920. This baker sold the recipe to a bakery in Enkhuizen.
 A baker with surname ‘de Joode’ baked the biscuits.
 Jodenkoeken are big but very flat, making it a cheap product to produce. A lot of cheap products got the prefix Jewish in the past. A lot of Jews were poor, making it likely that they bought cheaper things because it was necessary.
 The last story associates the biscuit with the unleavened bread baked by the Jews of ancient Egypt at the time of the exodus. The connection is made by the physical properties that both the biscuits and unleavened bread have in common: they are both flat, crunchy and have a very low moisture content, resulting in a long shelf-life.

In the 1970s the name was thought to be discriminatory by some, and the manufacturer considered changing it, but ultimately decided against it. The name has received little to no controversy since then, and prominent rights activist Wim Kortenoeven, specialising in Jewish history, (while critical of the naming of the Dutch sweet jodenvet "Jew fat" (now borsthoning "chest honey")), said he saw nothing wrong with the name. 
In 2021 Bakery Davelaar in Alkmaar decided to rename the Jodenkoek to Odekoek (or Ode biscuit).

Package 

Originally, the biscuits were sold in metal tins with a yellow wrapper. Nowadays jodenkoeken are also sold in plastic tins lined with a purple wrapper. Because the biscuits are packaged in an air-tight tin, they remain fresh and crunchy.

See also
 List of shortbread biscuits and cookies

References

External links 
 Website of producer Davelaar Koeken, Amarant Bakkersholding B.V.
 Website of producer Van Dijk Banket B. V
 goeievraag.nl, origin of the word

Cookies
Dutch cuisine
Shortbread